David L. Young is an American politician and the current Treasurer of Colorado. He served as a Democratic member of the Colorado House of Representatives, representing District 50 from the time of his appointment on July 28, 2011 to fill the vacancy caused by the resignation of Jim Riesberg until his term ended and he took office as State Treasurer in early 2019. He won a second term as state treasurer in 2022.

Education
Young earned his BS in mathematics from Colorado State University and his MA from the University of Colorado.

Career
Young was an educator, teaching math and technology in the Greeley Weld 6 School District at Heath Junior High in Greeley from 1975 to 1999. He worked for two years as an information architect with iXL, an international Web design firm, and as a coder for a small programming company in Colorado Springs that performed DoD programming for NORAD.  He worked as a senior instructor for the Information and Learning Technologies program at the University of Colorado, Denver.

Young represented House District 50. The district encompasses Greeley, Evans and Garden City. Young was appointed in 2011 before being elected in 2012, and reelected in 2014 and 2016.

After the 2013 September floods, Young was appointed co-chairman of the Flood Disaster Study Committee. Members of the bipartisan committee toured communities damaged by the flooding and created legislation to help homeowners and communities rebuild and recover. Young was the prime sponsor of legislation creating a grant program to repair damaged water and wastewater facilities.

In 2013, Young was one of the prime sponsors of bipartisan legislation creating an Advanced Industries Accelerator program for startup companies in Colorado.  In 2014 he was a prime sponsor of a bill extending the program after its successful first year. During 2014 he was also a prime sponsor of a bill creating a tax break for small businesses with less than $15,000 in business personal property.

Young crafted legislation to overhaul the state's Medicaid program.

In November 2014, Rep. Young was appointed by Speaker Hullinghorst as a member of the Joint Budget Committee (JBC) and was named as chair of the House Appropriations Committee.  He served in those positions until November 2018. Young was elected Colorado State Treasurer on November 6, 2018, and assumed office on January 8, 2019.

On January 8, 2019, Young was sworn in as Colorado State Treasurer. In June 2019, Young's wife, Mary Young, was appointed by a vacancy committee to serve in his former state house seat following the resignation of his successor, Rochelle Galindo.

In the 2022 Colorado State Treasurer election, Young won a second term as state treasurer.

Elections
2012: Young was unopposed for the June 26, 2012 Democratic Primary, winning with 1,494 votes; and won the November 6, 2012 General election with 14,937 votes (60.0%) against Republican nominee Skip Carlson.
2018: Young was the Democratic candidate for State Treasurer, having won the primary election in June, 2018.

References

External links

Government website
Campaign website
Official website at the Colorado General Assembly (archived)

|-

21st-century American politicians
Colorado State University alumni
Living people
Democratic Party members of the Colorado House of Representatives
People from Greeley, Colorado
Place of birth missing (living people)
State treasurers of Colorado
University of Colorado alumni
Year of birth missing (living people)